The Hotel Roanoke & Conference Center is a historic hotel located in the Gainsboro neighborhood of Roanoke, Virginia.  Originally built in 1882, the hotel has been rebuilt and expanded many times. The central wing dates to 1938. The hotel is currently owned by Virginia Tech and operated under the Curio Collection by Hilton brand. It was added to the National Register of Historic Places in 1996.

History 

The original structure of the Hotel Roanoke was built in 1882 by the Norfolk and Western Railway (now part of the Norfolk Southern Railway), which had recently constructed its administrative offices in the city, bringing in over a thousand railroad workers. The hotel was designed by Philadelphia architect George T. Pearson in the Tudor Revival style and officially opened on Christmas Day, 1882. A new main wing was added on the western side in 1890, replacing the central portion of the 1882 structure.

In July, 1898, a fire started in the kitchen which burned down the second and third stories of the 1890 main wing and shut down the hotel for several months. The hotel was restored and reopened in January, 1899. In 1916, the last remaining portion of the 1882 structure was moved to the rear of the hotel so a new wing could be added in its place, on the eastern side of the hotel, designed by the Roanoke firm of Frye and Chesterman. In 1931, the surviving original 1882 wing was demolished and replaced. The small 1931 wing, at the rear of the present hotel, is the oldest surviving portion of the structure.

The hotel was completely transformed in 1938, when the 1890/1898 main wing was demolished and replaced with the central wing that stands today, with its tower and the hotel's lobby and public rooms. The new main wing was designed by Knut W. Lind, of the New York firm of George B. Post and Sons, renowned for their hotel designs across the country. In 1946, the 1916 east wing was demolished and replaced with a larger wing designed by Small, Smith and Reeb, of Cleveland, Ohio. In 1954, the same firm designed a small addition at the rear of the 1938 main wing, giving the hotel its present form.

In 1983, employees of Hotel Roanoke went on strike for 6 months after union negotiations broke down. After the strike was concluded, the hotel refused to recall 36 of the striking workers but was ordered to reinstate them when the National Labor Relation Board found that their dismissal violated labor law.

In 1989, Norfolk Southern deeded the Hotel Roanoke to the Virginia Polytechnic Institute and State University (Virginia Tech) for $65,000 (USD). After the flag lowering ceremony on November 30, the hotel was closed. Sale of the contents began and continued for 17 days.

In 1992, the "Renew Roanoke" campaign was launched to raise enough money to reopen the hotel. Virginia Tech had set a deadline of December 31, 1992 to have enough money. By late fall, the campaign was still short $1 million. In an unprecedented Christmas-time fundraiser, the campaign succeeded, raising $5.006 million. Norfolk Southern then donated an additional $2 million; 30 times what it received for the hotel. The Hotel Roanoke was completely remodeled and restored at a cost of $28 million and a new $13 million conference center was built directly adjacent.  A pedestrian bridge was also constructed over Norfolk Southern's railroad tracks to link the hotel and conference center to downtown Roanoke near the Wachovia Tower. The Hotel Roanoke reopened on April 3, 1995, managed by the DoubleTree chain.

Roanoke's landmark former passenger rail station was built across the street from the hotel.  In 2004, it was converted in a museum devoted to the photography of O. Winston Link as well as housing the Roanoke Valley Visitors and Convention Bureau.

On February 28, 2016, The Hotel Roanoke & Conference Center transferred within Hilton from the DoubleTree to the Curio Collection by Hilton brand.

Famous guests
In addition to hosting many conventions, the Hotel Roanoke has also had a number of famous guests, including:

Dwight Eisenhower
Richard Nixon
Gerald Ford
Jimmy Carter
Ronald Reagan
George H. W. Bush
Douglas MacArthur
Mahalia Jackson
Aerosmith
Spiro Agnew
Dick Cheney
Hilary Duff
Jerry Seinfeld
Ric Flair
Shania Twain
George Takei
Kevin Hart
Tom Osborne
Henry Ford
Thomas Edison
Harvey Firestone
Wayne Newton
John Burroughs

References

External links

Hotel Roanoke, 110 Shenandoah Avenue, Roanoke, Roanoke City, VA: 1 photo and 1 photo caption page at Historic American Buildings Survey
Official site
Webcam

Virginia Tech
Historic American Buildings Survey in Virginia
Roanoke
Roanoke
National Register of Historic Places in Roanoke, Virginia
Roanoke
Convention centers in Virginia
Tudor Revival architecture in Virginia
Roanoke
Buildings and structures in Roanoke, Virginia
Roanoke
Norfolk and Western Railway
Event venues on the National Register of Historic Places in Virginia
1882 establishments in Virginia